Herrera may refer to:

People
Herrera (surname)

Places 
Herrera, Entre Ríos, a village and municipality in Argentina
Herrera, Santiago del Estero, a village and municipality in Argentina
Enrique Olaya Herrera Airport, an airport in Medellín, Colombia
Herrera International Airport, a closed airport in Santo Domingo, Dominican Republic
Los Herrera, a municipality in Nuevo León, Mexico
Herrera Province, a province in Panama
Herrera (corregimiento), Panama
Herrera (Asunción), a barrio of Asunción, Paraguay
La Herrera, a municipality in Castile-La Mancha, Spain
Herrera de Pisuerga, a municipality in Palencia, Spain
Herrera, Seville, a municipality in Andalusia, Spain
Herrera (Santurce), a sector of Santurce in San Juan, Puerto Rico, United States
Río Herrera, a river in Puerto Rico, United States
Los Herreras, a municipality in Durango, Mexico

Other
 Herrera (cicada), a genus

See also
Herrerian, an architectural style named after Juan de Herrera